Collégien is a commune in the Seine-et-Marne department in the Île-de-France region in north-central France.

Demographics
The inhabitants are called Collégeois.

Education
There is one primary school group containing preschool and elementary school, Les écoles des Saules. Collège Victor Schœlcher, a junior high school in Torcy; and Lycée Jean-Moulin, a senior high school/sixth-form college in Torcy, serve the community.

See also
Communes of the Seine-et-Marne department

References

External links

Town hall 
1999 Land Use, from IAURIF (Institute for Urban Planning and Development of the Paris-Île-de-France région) 
 

Communes of Seine-et-Marne
Val de Bussy